Saronno Sud railway station is a railway station in Italy. It serves the southern suburbs of the town of Saronno.

Services
Saronno Sud is served by the lines S1, S3 and S9 of the Milan suburban railway network, operated by the lombard railway company Trenord.

See also
 Milan suburban railway network

External links
 Ferrovienord official site - Saronno Sud railway station 

Railway stations in Lombardy
Ferrovienord stations
Railway stations opened in 1991
Milan S Lines stations
1991 establishments in Italy
Railway stations in Italy opened in the 20th century